Leucadendron thymifolium, the Malmesbury conebush, is a flower-bearing shrub belonging to the genus Leucadendron and forms part of the fynbos. The plant is native to the Western Cape, South Africa.

Description
Fire destroys the plant but the seeds survive. The seeds are stored in a toll on the female plant and fall to the ground, two months after the plant has flowered. The plant is unisexual and there are male and female plants. It is fertilized by insects.

Distribution and habitat
The plant occurs on the Malmesbury Plain from Noordhoek to Klipheuwel.

References

Threatened Species Programme | SANBI Red List of South African Plants
Leucadendron thymifolium (Salisb. ex Knight)
Leucadendron thymifolium (Malmesbury conebush)
Malmesbury Conebush

thymifolium